Huancabamba District is one of eight  districts of the province Oxapampa in Peru.

Places of interest
 Yanachaga–Chemillén National Park

References